Con mis hijos no te metas (CMHNTM) is a social movement born in Lima, Peru, on 26 December 2016, in opposition to the public gender development policies of the Peruvian government in education and other areas of public administration as part of the 2017 national curriculum. Like other Christian conservative movements, its adherents use the term "gender ideology".

The movement claims that the measures of "gender ideology" seek to destabilize the nuclear family,  following a conspiracy theory which accuses George Soros of aiming to establish a New World Order whose purpose is to promote homosexuality from childhood, legalize abortion and transition industries, same-sex marriage, control the population, and moral degradation. These efforts will then culminate in domination of the world economy.

CMHNTM assure they are independent from political and religious ideology, although its membership includes Christian fundamentalists and sympathizers of the Christian right and the Fujimorist political formation Popular Force.

Context

When Pedro Pablo Kuczynski became president, he comissioned  to modify educational requirements to teach respect of any sexual orientation. One provisions was gender equality, due to the high rates of aggression against women and homosexuals, including homicides. It was also intended to strengthen sex education and reduce dropouts due to teenage pregnancy. It was approved to combine gender studies in a new agenda, in a language comprehensible to primary students, and that would be fully enforced in 2017.

   
 When faced with the first conservative oppositions to the agenda and the controversy over the alleged gender ideology, Saavedra declared:

   
 The minister of education Jaime Saavedra was censored at the end of 2016. His successor Marilú Martens continued to promote the 2017 national curriculum.

National marches

To protest school curriculum, a series of marches were organized. Subsequently, a national protest was organized and held on 4 March 2017. It was supported by various artists, politicians, and Evangelical as well as Catholic movements. In Lima, the protestors gathered at Plaza de toros de Acho (Rímac),  (San Martín de Porres), Coliseo Amauta (Breña) and parque Mariscal Castilla (Lince), moving towards Plaza San Martín.

Controversies 
Since its creation, members have committed aggressive acts, such as attacking a member of the LGBT community who participated in a counterprotest; but the most known controversy involved  pastor Rodolfo González Cruz, who was accused of inciting hatred in his preaching: "(...) When encountering a woman having sex with an animal, you kill the woman and the animal, whether it is a dog or any other animal, in the name of Jesus (...)"; he was also accused of saying that: "Homosexuals are rotten, corrupt, and unhappy people who are doomed to death". Despite the evidence, González denied inciting to murder homosexuals.

Radio announcer , who showed support for the religious collective, participated in a march on 4 March, during which he made various rude comments against the opposition, their children, and LGBT couples. He was fired from  due to his participation as his contract stated he was prohibited from participating in public marches. Days after, he was hired by another company and expressed his continuous support of the movement, stating, "Gender ideology exists".

On 11 January 2017, the Ecuadorian  accused the group of promoting homophobia.

Street and bridge protests and survey on gender approach 
On 25 April 2019, the media reported CMHNTM protests on various bridges of the Vía Expresa Luis Fernán Bedoya Reyes (from Barranco to Lima District), as well as ones in different streets of capital districts such as Los Olivos, El Agustino, San Juan de Miraflores, Puente Piedra, La Molina, Lince, Villa María del Triunfo, among others. In such places appeared the well-known pink/light blue posters, in clear allusion to the female/male dichotomy, but unlike the slogan Con Mis Hijos No Te Metas, the phrases were more radical. “Minister Flor Pablo, no to school orgies”, “Vizcarra do not corrupt the education of children. No to pornography in schools”, “Vizcarra, do not promote sexual perversion and abortions”, "Gender Focus = Anal Sex", were some.

On 25 April 2019, pollster Ipsos Peru with newspaper El Comercio published a survey conducted between 12 to 14 April 2019, in which 82% of Peruvians approved the inclusion of gender approach in school curriculum, reaching 91% in socio-economic level (NSE) B. However, the percentage was reduced to 74% in NSE A, and to 78% in the population group aged 40 years and older. 15% were against the educational measure.

Information manipulation 
The use of misrepresentation to reinforce a negative image about the measures taken by the government to combat homophobia through early childhood education has been denounced and documented. NTMCMH assured and denounced that in the tutoring guide for sixth grade students, published by the Ministry of Education in November 2015, contained some images of the classic story Little Red Riding Hood where the protagonist could be changed by children. Also, according to the movement, in the comprehensive sex education guide for primary school teachers published in 2014, a story entitled Oliver Button Is a Girl was included that sought to eliminate discrimination against people who opt for activities typically associated with the opposite sex. This misrepresentation was published by Fujimorist congressmen  and Juan Carlos Gonzales on their Twitter accounts claiming they were a part of the current curriculum, provoking protests mostly from conservatives. However, the information correlated to stories published in Spain.

See also 

 Christianity and homosexuality
 LGBT rights in Peru
 Freedom of education

References 

Conservatism in Peru
Social movements in Peru
Right-wing populism
Anti-abortion movement
Fujimorism
Protests in Peru
Christianity and politics
2017 in Peru
2016 in Peru